Country Boy & Country Girl is a studio album by American country music artists Jimmy Dean and Dottie West. It was released in November 1970 on RCA Victor Records and was produced by Jerry Bradley. The project was a collection duet recordings between both artists. It was Dean's first collaborative album and West's second. The album spawned one single entitled "Slowly", which would be released in 1971. Country Boy & Country Girl would also reach peak positions on national music publication charts following its release.

Background and content
Jimmy Dean had wanted to record an album of duets with Dottie West several years prior to the release of Country Boy & Girl. However, scheduling conflicts required them to postpone the project until they could make arrangements. The album was produced by Jerry Bradley at RCA Studio B in September 1970. The record consisted of ten tracks, all of which were duet recordings. All of the album's tracks were previously recorded by other artists. Most of the songs were covers of duet recordings made hits by country music duo's. Among these tracks was "Wish I Didn't Have to Miss You", which was originally a hit for Jack Greene and Jeannie Seely. A second featured track is "Jackson", which was first a hit for Johnny Cash and June Carter. A third example is "Let It Be Me", which had recently been a duet hit for Glen Campbell and Bobby Gentry.

Release and reception
Country Boy & Country Girl was released in November 1970 on RCA Victor Records. The album was issued as a vinyl LP, containing five songs on each side of the record. The album peaked at number 42 on the Billboard Top Country Albums chart following its release. The album only spawned one single, "Slowly". Released in January 1971, the single became a top 40 hit on the Billboard Hot Country Singles chart, reaching number 29 that year. Following its release, Country Boy & Country Girl was reviewed by Billboard in their November 1970 issue. Writers praised duet partnership, calling it powerful. They also highlighted several tracks that they believed were standout songs, including the single. "This is very powerful country merchandise, coupling two artists of name power in a series of great country duets," reviewers commented.

Track listing

Personnel
All credits are adapted from the liner notes of Country Boy & Country Girl.

Musical personnel
 Harold Bradley – bass
 David Briggs – piano
 Jimmy Dean – vocals
 Pete Drake – pedal steel guitar
 Ray Edenton – guitar
 Buddy Harman – drums
 The Jordanaires – background vocals
 Grady Martin – guitar
 Charlie McCoy – harmonica, vibes
 Bob Moore – bass
 Bill West – pedal steel guitar
 Dottie West – vocals
 Morris Wix – guitar

Technical personnel
 Jerry Bradley – producer
Les Ladd – recording engineer
Roy Shockley – recording technician

Chart performance

Release history

References

External links
LP Discography entry for Country Boy and Country Girl

1970 albums
Albums produced by Jerry Bradley (music executive)
Dottie West albums
Jimmy Dean albums
RCA Records albums
Vocal duet albums